Thomas Henry Naisby (12 March 1878 – 1927) was an English professional footballer who played as a goalkeeper for Sunderland.

References

1878 births
1927 deaths
Footballers from Sunderland
English footballers
Association football goalkeepers
Sunderland A.F.C. players
Sunderland West End F.C. players
Reading F.C. players
Leeds City F.C. players
South Shields F.C. (1889) players
Luton Town F.C. players
Darlington F.C. players
English Football League players